Ryan Meara (born November 15, 1990) is an American professional soccer player who plays as a goalkeeper for the New York Red Bulls of Major League Soccer.

Career

College and amateur
Meara was raised in Yonkers, New York and attended Fordham Preparatory School before enrolling at Fordham University in 2008.
He also trained with Reading of England with their youth academies in July 2007 and February 2008. While at Fordham he made 74 appearances and had 31 clean sheets. His 31 shutouts are a school record. In total, Meara owned nine Fordham University goal keeper records including career games in goal, minutes played, goal against average in a career (0.87) and a single season (0.65 in 2011) and save percentage in a single season (.862 in 2011). In 2010 Meara was named team captain for the Rams. Meara was named All-Atlantic Ten three times before earning conference Defensive Player of the Year honors in 2011. 
 
During the 2009 season, Meara also played for the Long Island Rough Riders of the USL Premier Development League. In 2010, he joined  Jersey Express and was voted the league's goalkeeper of the year as he recorded 8 clean sheets in 12 appearances during the 2010 PDL season. In two years with Jersey Express, he made 28 appearances for the club.

Professional
Meara was drafted 31st overall by New York Red Bulls in the 2012 MLS SuperDraft and signed with the club on February 6, 2012. On March 11, Meara started his first game against FC Dallas. On April 28, he recorded his first professional shutout against the New England Revolution. Meara started the first 18 games of the season and emerged as a leading candidate for the MLS Rookie of the Year Award. However, on July 8 he sustained a hip injury during a game which required surgery and ended his season.

On December 11, 2014, New York Red Bulls announced that Meara would be loaned to New York City FC for the 2015 season. After suffering a torn meniscus in preseason training, Meara would make his first start for NYCFC on April 24, 2015. It was his first Major League Soccer appearance after a hip injury ended his rookie season on July 8, 2012, a span of 1,020 days.

Meara returned to the Red Bulls at the conclusion of the 2015 season. On March 26, the New York Red Bulls announced that they had loaned Meara and six other first team players to New York Red Bulls II for their home opener. He went on to make his first appearance for New York Red Bulls II on March 26, appearing as a starter in a 2–2 draw against Toronto FC II. After helping lead New York to the USL regular season title, Meara helped the club advance to the 2016 USL Cup Final by making two saves in a penalty shootout as top-seeded NYRBII defeated second-seeded Louisville City FC 4–3 in the shootout of the Eastern Conference Final. On October 23, 2016, Meara captained New York in a 5–1 victory over Swope Park Rangers in the 2016 USL Cup Final.

On June 14, 2017, Meara led New York to a 1–0 victory over league rival and former club New York City FC in the 2017 Lamar Hunt U.S. Open Cup. On July 13, 2017, Meara in his role as keeper for New York in the Cup led his team to a 1–0 victory over New England Revolution, advancing to the semifinals of the Open Cup.

On May 10, 2022, Meara recorded a shutout for New York in a 3-0 victory over DC United, helping the club advance to Round of 16 in the 2022 U.S. Open Cup.

International
Meara, who qualified for Irish citizenship through his grandparents, was named to the Republic of Ireland U-21 team on April 30, 2012. However, the Red Bulls did not permit him to train with Ireland, despite the call-up would not require him to miss any MLS games.

In June 2014, Ireland's senior team used Red Bulls' training facilities before a friendly match against Portugal, and Meara joined the Irish for a practice session. Ireland coach Martin O'Neill said he would "keep an eye on things".

Honors

Club
New York Red Bulls
MLS Supporters' Shield (2): 2013,  2018

New York Red Bulls II
USL Cup (1): 2016

Individual
Fordham Athletic Hall of Fame

Career statistics

References

External links
 
 Fordham Rams bio

1990 births
Living people
American soccer players
Fordham Rams men's soccer players
Gabelli School of Business alumni
Long Island Rough Riders players
Jersey Express S.C. players
New York Red Bulls players
New York City FC players
New York Red Bulls II players
USL League Two players
Major League Soccer players
USL Championship players
American people of Irish descent
New York Red Bulls draft picks
Sportspeople from Yonkers, New York
Soccer players from New York (state)
Association football goalkeepers
Fordham Preparatory School alumni